Ngaju may refer to:

 Ngaju people
 Ngaju language